The Kate Challis RAKA Award is an arts award worth , awarded annually by the University of Melbourne in Victoria, Australia to Indigenous Australian creative artists. It is awarded in a five-year cycle, each year in a different area of the arts: creative prose, drama, the visual arts, script-writing (screenplay or for theatre) and poetry.

The award is sponsored by Professor Emeritius Bernard Smith, art and cultural historian, in honour his late wife, Kate Challis, who was earlier known as Ruth Adeney. "RAKA" is an acronym for "Ruth Adeney Koori Award". In the Pintupi language, "raka" means "five", and in Warlpiri, "rdaka" means "hand".

It has been awarded since 1991.

Past winners
Past winners include:
Steven McGregor and David Tranter for the screenplay of Sweet Country, 2017
Yhonnie Scarce for her artwork of blown glass, Remember Royalty, 2018
Alexis Wright for her novel The Swan Book (2016)
Ivan Sen for the film script for Toomelah, 2011
 Vivienne Cleven, jointly awarded for creative prose in two novels: Bitin’ Back (2001) and Her Sister’s Eye (2002)
Dallas Winmar, playwright, both in 2002 for her play Aliwa! and in 2008 for Yibiyung
Mabel Juli, Visual Arts, for her painting Under The Sun in 2013
Mudrooroo, for creative prose, Us Mob, in 1996
Kevin Gilbert for his collection of poetry Black from the Edge, 1995

References

Arts awards in Australia
Awards established in 1991